Enrico Garzelli (24 July 1909 – 15 July 1992) was an Italian rower who competed in the 1932 Summer Olympics and in the 1936 Summer Olympics.

In 1932 he won the silver medal as member of the Italian boat in the men's eight competition. Four years later he won his second silver medal as part of the Italian boat in the men's eight event.

References

External links
 
 

1909 births
1992 deaths
Sportspeople from Livorno
Italian male rowers
Olympic rowers of Italy
Rowers at the 1932 Summer Olympics
Rowers at the 1936 Summer Olympics
Olympic silver medalists for Italy
Olympic medalists in rowing
Medalists at the 1936 Summer Olympics
Medalists at the 1932 Summer Olympics
European Rowing Championships medalists